Curt Sachs (29 June 1881 – 5 February 1959) was a German musicologist. He was one of the founders of modern organology (the study of musical instruments). Among his contributions was the Hornbostel–Sachs system, which he created with Erich von Hornbostel.

Biography
Born in Berlin, Sachs studied piano, music theory and composition as a youth in that city. However, his doctorate from Berlin University (where  he was later professor of musicology) in 1904 was on the history of art, with his thesis on the sculpture of Verrocchio. He began a career as an art historian, but promptly became more devoted to music, eventually being appointed director of the Staatliche Instrumentensammlung, a large collection of musical instruments. He reorganised and restored much of the collection, and his career as an organologist began.

In 1913, Sachs saw the publication of his book Real-Lexicon der Musikinstrumente, probably the most comprehensive survey of musical instruments in 200 years. The following year, he and Erich Moritz von Hornbostel published the work for which they are probably now best known in Zeitschrift für Ethnologie, a new system of musical instrument classification. It is today known as the Sachs-Hornbostel system. It has been much revised over the years, and has been the subject of some criticism, but it remains the most widely used system of classification by ethnomusicologists and organologists.

When the Nazis came to power in 1933, Sachs was dismissed from his posts in Germany by the Nazi Party because he was a Jew. As a result, he moved to Paris, and later to the United States, where he settled in New York City. From 1937 to 1953 he taught at New York University, and also worked at the New York Public Library. In 1953, he was appointed adjunct professor at Columbia University, a post he held until his death in 1959. He was a member of the American Musicological Society and served as president from 1948 to 1950.

His numerous books include works on rhythm, dance and musical instruments, with his The History of Musical Instruments (1940), a comprehensive survey of musical instruments worldwide throughout history, seen as one of the most important.  The long relationship he had with W. W. Norton & Company began with The Rise of Music in the Ancient World (1943).  Although these works have been superseded by more recent research in some respects, they are still seen as essential texts in the field.

Sachs died in 1959 in New York City. In honor of Sachs' legacy, the American Musical Instrument Society established the Curt Sachs Award in 1983, which it gives each year to an individual who has made significant contributions to field of organology.

See also
 Berlin Musical Instrument Museum
 State Institute for Music Research

References

Further reading 
 Bredow, Moritz von. 2012. "Rebellische Pianistin. Das Leben der Grete Sultan zwischen Berlin und New York." (Biography). Schott Music, Mainz, Germany.  (Contains important references to Curt Sachs, who became a most helpful friend of pianist Grete Sultan, as Professor in Berlin and New York).

External links

 
 Curt Sachs card files Jerome Robbins Dance Division, The New York Public Library.

1881 births
1959 deaths
Jewish emigrants from Nazi Germany to the United States
Musicologists from Berlin
Jewish classical musicians
Jewish American composers
Jewish musicologists
German ethnomusicologists
American ethnomusicologists
Dance historians
20th-century German musicologists